Henderson Settlement is a rural community in Wickham Parish in Queens County, New Brunswick, Canada. It is located near the communities of Shannon, Belyeas Cove, and Bald Hill.

History
Original settlement of the Kelly family claimed by the Kellys around 175 years ago about 25 years before Canada was instituted.

Notable people

See also
List of communities in New Brunswick

References

Communities in Queens County, New Brunswick